Coan wine is wine from the Greek island of Kos, and in particular a style of wine invented there in classical antiquity that was known for its saltiness.

History

This distinctively salty style of wine was, according to Pliny, invented accidentally by a slave, who added sea water to the must to meet his production quota. The result apparently became popular, and was imitated by neighboring wine makers, such as those on Rhodes. From about the 4th century BC, it began to be exported in large quantities. Since the addition of salt water tended to mask any local distinctiveness, other regions even began manufacturing amphorae in the Coan style in which to ship their imitations of Coan-style wine, meaning that by some point "Coan wine" became a generic term for a style of wine that was in fact made in many different locations.

The wine's reputation was quite good in classical Greece—Strabo mentions it alongside the well-regarded Chian and Lesbian wines. The connoisseurs of ancient Rome, however, preferred wines without sea water added, and both Pliny and Galen strongly recommend unadulterated wines such as those of Chios.

Production

Two accounts of the production of Coan-style wine survive, one given by Cato the Elder in De agri cultura, and the other, attributed to Berytius, in the Byzantine collection Geoponica. Two alternate recipes are attributed to Berytius. The first prescribes boiling 3 parts must and 1 part sea water down to two thirds. The other prescribes starting with 2 metretai white wine and mixing into it: 1 cup salt, 3 cups hepsetos (that is, grape must that has been concentrated by boiling), 1 cup vetch flour, 100 drachmai melilot, 16 drachmai apples, and 16 drachmai Celtic nard.

See also
Ancient Greece and wine

References

Ancient wine
Greek wine
Kos
Ancient Greek culture